Kevin Roshon Samuels (c. March 13, 1969May 5, 2022) was an American internet personality and image consultant. He rose to popularity in 2020 and was considered a public figure based on his YouTube and Instagram live streams discussing modern society and relationships.

Early life  
Kevin Samuels was born in Oklahoma City. He attended Millwood High School, and studied chemical engineering at the University of Oklahoma, but was not able to graduate due to having cancer at age 21. In a  March 6, 2021 YouTube video, Samuels said he was 51 years old on a live podcast, placing his year of birth at 1969 or 1970, and later news reports corroborate that he was 53 at the time of death, while some earlier news reports at the time of death report his age at 56 or 57, placing his year of birth at 1965 or 1966.

Career
Samuels worked in the marketing industry before starting his own image-consulting firm in 2013. He accumulated 1.4 million subscribers on YouTube, 1.2 million followers on Instagram and thousands on several other online platforms like Twitter and TikTok. The New York Times wrote he built an image as a "plain-spoken, hypermasculine authority" who advocated for "strict gender roles" in which men assumed predominance. 

Samuels gained traction in mainstream hip-hop culture, interviewing Nicki Minaj and T.I., while also making guest appearances on No Jumper, Joe Budden TV and VladTV. In 2022, Samuels made a cameo appearance on the television series Atlanta in the episode "Rich Wigga, Poor Wigga". In February 2022, Samuels appeared in a music video in which he acted as a therapist and dating coach for rapper Future on the single "Worst Day". He also interviewed popular Instagram models like Brittany Renner, and reality TV stars like Tommie Lee. Several prominent guests such as Minaj, Marlon Wayans, and Tamar Braxton showed support for his work.

Samuels' comments on men and women were sometimes controversial. As an image consultant, he often asked women who called his show asking for dating advice to rate themselves based on what he called the perceived sexual market place value for dating. He then critiqued women based on dress size, height and weight according to his perception of their sexual market place value. He stressed a belief that some women had unrealistically high standards for the types of men they should be dating, while also criticizing men for being poor or overweight. In addition, he strongly criticized the black community for failing to meet traditional values, especially concerning its high out-of-wedlock birth rate and relatively low marriage rate. Samuels' critics decried him as being actively misogynoir, and a part of the Black manosphere, whereas his supporters defended him as an advocate for traditional values.

Personal life and death
Samuels was married and divorced twice. He had a daughter.

On May 5, 2022, Samuels was found unresponsive in his Atlanta apartment after a woman who had stayed with him the night prior called 911, telling the operator Samuels was complaining of chest pains and that he had collapsed. Samuels was rushed to a hospital, where he later died. According to the medical examiner's report Samuels had hypertension, which contributed to his death.

References

External links 

 

20th-century African-American people
21st-century African-American people
21st-century American male actors
1960s births
2022 deaths
African-American male actors
Age controversies
American consulting businesspeople
American marketing people
American YouTubers
Businesspeople from Atlanta
Businesspeople from Oklahoma City
Deaths from hypertension
Male critics of feminism
University of Oklahoma alumni